Western Australia v Commonwealth, also known as the First Territory Senators' Case, was an important decision of the High Court of Australia concerning the procedure in section 57 of the Constitution and the representation of territories in the Senate. The Court unanimously held that legislation providing for the representation of the Northern Territory and the Australia Capital Territory in the Senate had been passed in accordance with section 57 of the Constitution and, by majority, that the representation of the territories was constitutionally valid.

Background

Representation in the Senate 
Section 7 of the Constitution provides for the composition of the Senate:

Section 122 provides for the Commonwealth to make laws for any territory, including for the representation of the territories in Parliament:

Prior to the passage of the Senate (Representation of Territories) Act 1973, only the states had been represented in the Senate. The act provided for the Northern Territory and the Australian Capital Territory to each be represented by two senators. At the time, each state was represented by 10 senators.

Deadlocks between the Houses of Parliament 
Section 57 of the Constitution provides the procedure for the breaking of deadlocks between the House of Representatives and the Senate:

Passage of the laws 
During its first term in office, the Whitlam Government held a majority in the House of Representatives but not the Senate, which twice rejected 10 government bills. Amongst those bills, the Commonwealth Electoral Bill (No 2) 1973 was rejected for a second time on 29 August 1973, and the Representation Bill 1973 and the Senate (Representation of Territories) Bill 1973 were both rejected for a second time on 14 November 1973.

On 14 February 1974, the Governor-General, Sir Paul Hasluck, prorogued the Parliament until 28 February 1974. Subsequently, on 14 April 1974, the Governor-General dissolved both Houses, citing 6 bills which had been twice rejected by the Senate, including the Commonwealth Electoral Bill (No 2) 1973, the Representation Bill 1973, and the Senate (Representation of Territories) Bill 1973.

At the double dissolution election in May 1974, the Whitlam government was returned with a slightly reduced majority in the House of Representatives and still without a Senate majority. Following the Senate's further rejection of the bills used as justification for the double dissolution election, an historic joint sitting of the Commonwealth Parliament was convened in August 1974, at which all 6 of the rejected bills which had been cited for the double dissolution were passed.

The joint sitting had also passed another Act, the Petroleum and Minerals Authority Act 1973, which was successfully challenged in Victoria v Commonwealth on the basis that there had not been the required gap between the Senate's first and second rejections of that Act.

Argument 
The states of Western Australia and New South Wales challenged the validity of all 3 electoral Acts on the basis that they had not be passed in accordance with section 57. They also, along with the state of Queensland, challenged the validity of the Act providing for territory representation on the ground that the Constitution did not allow the Parliament to provide for full representation of the territories in the Senate.

The plaintiffs argued that the laws were not validly passed by the Parliament because the prorogation of Parliament and the passage of time between the Senate rejecting the laws for a second time and the proclamation dissolving the Parliament meant that the bills were not proposed law within the meaning of section 57, that the prorogation had precluded the exercise of the power to dissolve both Houses of Parliament and that the joint sitting was invalid because it had acted beyond power in considering the Petroleum and Minerals Authority Act 1973.

In relation to the representation of the territories, the plaintiffs argued that section 7 of the Constitution established the Senate as a States' House and that the representation envisaged by section 122 must be something less than full membership.

Four future High Court judges appeared as counsel in the case: Ronald Wilson, then the Solicitor-General for Western Australia, William Deane, for New South Wales, Michael McHugh, as junior counsel for the Commonwealth, and Daryl Dawson, then the Solicitor-General for Victoria.

Decision 
Each member of the Court delivered a separate opinion. The Court unanimously held that the laws had been validly passed in accordance with section 57 and by majority held that the Commonwealth could validly provide for full representation of the territories in the Senate.

Passage of the laws 
All members of the Court, other than Barwick CJ, held that section 57 does not impose a requirement of undue delay between the second rejection of the proposed laws and the dissolution of Parliament by the Governor-General. Barwick CJ found that whilst there was a temporal limitation requiring the second rejection and the double dissolution to be related in time so as to form part of a current disagreement between the Houses, the lapse of time in this case was not sufficient to disqualify the bills from forming the basis for a double dissolution.

The entire Court also rejected the argument that the laws were invalid because the joint sitting had invalidly considered and passed the Petroleum and Minerals Authority Act 1973.

Representation of the territories 
McTiernan, Mason, Jacobs and Murphy JJ upheld the validity of the act providing for senators from the Northern Territory and the Australian Capital Territory. They held that the words of section 122 must be given their full meaning and be read as an exception to section 7. Mason J held this in the following terms: page 270.

The majority also rejected the argument that allowing for full territory representation in the Senate could permit the Commonwealth to 'swamp' the Senate with territory senators, effectively reducing the representation of the States. The majority said that the proper interpretation of the Constitution was not to be affected by the fear that a power might be abused.

Barwick CJ, Gibbs and Stephen JJ dissented. Each held that because section 7 referred only to the States, it was intended that the Senate would be a States' House and that the concept of representation envisaged by section 122 must be limited to less than full representation. Stephen J held in the following terms: page 258.

Subsequent events 
The first territory senators were elected at the 1975 election.

Following a change in the High Court's membership, McTiernan J retired in 1976 and was replaced by Aickin J, the representation of the territories was re-challenged in Queensland v Commonwealth (1977). The High Court again upheld the legislation, this time by an increased majority, with Mason, Jacobs and Murphy JJ affirming their earlier judgements, and Gibbs and Stephen JJ applying stare decisis to find that the legislation was constitutionally valid even though they considered the decision in Western Australia v Commonwealth to be wrong.

References 

High Court of Australia cases
1975 in Australian law
1975 in case law
Australian constitutional law